Jonathan Victor Barros (born 30 January 1984) is an Argentine professional boxer. He held the WBA (Regular) featherweight title from 2010 to 2011.

Professional career

IBF featherweight championship
In March 2010, Barros lost to IBF featherweight champion Yuriorkis Gamboa and his first shot at a World championship.

WBA featherweight championship
On 4 December 2010, Barros beat the veteran Irving Berry and won the WBA World featherweight championship. On March 12, 2011 Barros had his first successful title defense against Miguel Roman, followed by another against Celestino Caballero. However, Barros lost the title in a rematch against Caballero on October 14, 2011. Barros lost to undefeated Mikey Garcia on November 10, 2012.

IBF featherweight championship 
On 15 July 2017, Barros faced Lee Selby for the IBF featherweight title. Selby started the fight off well, and looked more lively than Barros, moving well and trying to land left hooks. In the sixth, Barros showed resilience as Selby did not look as good as in the early rounds. But Selby got back on his toes in the eighth, boxing well and keeping his advantage on the scorecards. Selby managed to drop Barros in the final round to cement a unanimous decision on the scorecards.

WBC featherweight championship 
In his next fight, Barros again challenged for a world title, this time against WBC super featherweight champion Miguel Berchelt. Berchelt started off strong and managed to drop Barros in the second round with a big left hook. Barros managed to get up and continued fighting, until he got dropped again in the third round, when his corner decided to stop the contest.

In his next fight, Barros faced an experienced veteran in Alfredo Santiago. Barros got dominated by his opponent, losing the fight by unanimous decision.

Professional boxing record 

{|class="wikitable" style="text-align:center; font-size:95%"
|-
!
!Result
!Record
!Opponent
!Type
!Round, time
!Date
!Location
!Notes
|-
|52
|Loss
|43–8–1
|align=left| Jaime Arboleda
|TKO
|4 (10), 
|19 Aug 2021
|align=left|  
|align=left|
|-
|51
|Win
|43-7-1
|align=left| Jorge Rodrigo Barrios
|UD
|10
|20 Feb 2021
|align=left|  
|
|-
|50
|Win
|42-7-1
|align=left| Guillermo Osvaldo Soloppi
|UD
|6
|20 Sep 2019
|align=left| 
|
|-
|49
|Loss
|41-7-1
|style="text-align:left;"| Alfredo Santiago
|UD
|12
|1 Dec 2018
|align=left| 
|align=left|
|-
|48
|Loss
|41-6-1
|style="text-align:left;"| Miguel Berchelt
|TKO
|3 (12), 
|23 Jun 2018
|align=left| 
|align=left|
|-
|47
|Loss
|41-5-1
|style="text-align:left;"| Lee Selby
|UD
|12
|15 Jul 2017
|align=left|  
|align=left|
|-
|46
|Win
|41-4-1
|align=left| Satoshi Hosono
|SD
|12
|3 Oct 2016
|align=left|
|align=left|
|-
|45
|Win
|40-4-1
|align=left| Pablo Martin Barboza
|UD
|10
|19 Dec 2015
|align=left|
|align=left|
|-
|44
|Win
|39–4-1
|align=left| Sergio Eduardo Gonzalez
|TKO
|6 (10)
|14 Mar 2015
|align=left|
|align=left|
|-
|43
|Win
|38–4-1
|align=left| Sergio Javier Escobar
|UD
|10 
|25 Oct 2014
|align=left|
|align=left|
|-
|42
|Win
|37–4-1
|align=left| Cid Edson Bispo Ribeiro 
|KO
|1 (10)
|8 Feb 2014
|align=left|
|align=left|
|-
|41
|Win
|36–4-1
|align=left| Isaias Santos Sampaio
|KO
|2 (10)
|28 Sep 2013
|align=left|
|align=left|
|-
|40
|Win
|35–4-1
|align=left| Diego Alberto Chaves
|KO
|5 (6) 
|18 May 2013
|align=left|
|align=left|
|-
|39
|Loss
|34–4–1
|align=left| Mikey Garcia
|TKO
|8 (10)
|10 Nov 2012
|align=left|
|
|-
|38
|Loss
|34–3–1
|align=left| Juan Carlos Salgado
|UD
|12
|18 Aug 2012
|align=left|
|align=left|
|-
|37
|Win
|34–2–1
|align=left| Gustavo Bermudez
|UD
|10
|23 Jun 2012
|align=left|
|align=left|
|- 
|36
|Loss
|33–2–1
|align=left| Celestino Caballero
|UD
|12
|14 Oct 2011
|align=left|
|align=left|
|-
|35
|Win
|33–1–1
|align=left| Celestino Caballero
|SD
|12
|2 Jul 2011
|align=left|
|align=left|
|-
|34
|Win
|32–1–1
|align=left| Miguel Roman
|UD
|12
|12 Mar 2011
|align=left|
|align=left|
|-
|33
|Win
|31–1–1
|align=left| Irving Berry
|TKO
|7 (12), 
|4 Dec 2010
|align=left|
|align=left|
|-
|32
|Win
|30–1–1
|align=left| Gustavo Bermudez
|KO
|1 (10)
|9 Oct 2010
|align=left|
|align=left|
|-
|31
|Win
|29–1–1
|align=left| Adrian Flamenco
|UD
|8
|29 May 2010
|align=left|
|align=left|
|-
|30
|Loss
|28–1–1
|align=left| Yuriorkis Gamboa
|UD
|12
|27 Mar 2010
|align=left|
|align=left|
|-
|29
|Win
|28–0–1
|align=left| Lazaro Santos de Jesus
|UD
|6
|13 Feb 2010
|align=left|
|align=left|
|-
|28
|Win
|27–0–1
|align=left| Luis Martinez
|KO
|3 (8), 
|18 Dec 2009
|align=left|
|align=left|
|-
|27
|Win
|26–0–1
|align=left| Guillermo de Jesus Paz
|UD
|10
|17 Oct 2009
|align=left|
|align=left|
|-
|26
|Win
|25–0–1
|align=left| Carlos Rodriguez
|RTD
|5 (10), 
|16 May 2009
|align=left|
|align=left|
|-
|25
|Win
|24–0–1
|align=left| Cristian Palma
|KO
|5 (12)
|7 Feb 2009
|align=left|
|align=left|
|-
|24
|Win
|23–0–1
|align=left| Hardy Paredes
|TKO
|3 (10)
|12 Sep 2008
|align=left|
|align=left|
|-
|23
|Win
|22–0–1
|align=left| Cristian Lopez
|KO
|1 (10), 
|26 Jul 2008
|align=left|
|align=left|
|-
|22
|Win
|21–0–1
|align=left| Leandro Almagro
|UD
|6
|26 Apr 2008
|align=left|
|align=left|
|-
|21
|Win
|20–0–1
|align=left| Victor Hugo Paz
|TKO
|2 (10), 
|26 Jan 2008
|align=left|
|align=left|
|-
|20
|Win
|19–0–1
|align=left| Pastor Maurin
|DQ
|4 (10)
|29 Sep 2007
|align=left|
|align=left|
|-
|19
|Win
|18–0–1
|align=left| Hector Cisneros
|TKO
|5 (6), 
|24 Aug 2007
|align=left|
|align=left|
|-
|18
|Win
|17–0–1
|align=left| Anibal Pieroni
|TKO
|4 (6), 
|22 Jun 2007
|align=left|
|align=left|
|-
|17
|Win
|16–0–1
|align=left| Gerardo Gomez
|KO
|9 (10), 
|19 May 2007
|align=left|
|align=left|
|-
|16
|Win
|15–0–1
|align=left| Victor Hugo Paz
|UD
|6
|20 Apr 2007
|align=left|
|align=left|
|-
|15
|Win
|14–0–1
|align=left| Gerardo Gomez
|UD
|6
|24 Feb 2007
|align=left|
|align=left|
|-
|14
|Win
|13–0–1
|align=left| Eduardo Ramos
|KO
|2 (6)
|25 Nov 2006
|align=left|
|align=left|
|-
|13
|style="background:#abcdef;"|Draw||12–0–1||align=left| Victor Hugo Paz
|PTS
|6
|26 Aug 2006
|align=left|
|align=left|
|-
|12
|Win
|12–0
|align=left| Rudy Mairena Ruiz
|UD
|6
|27 May 2006
|align=left|
|align=left|
|-
|11
|Win
|11–0
|align=left| Julio Martinez
|TKO
|4 (4), 
|28 Jan 2006
|align=left|
|align=left|
|-
|10
|Win
|10–0
|align=left| Ricardo Arano
|UD
|8
|1 Nov 2005
|align=left|
|align=left|
|-
|9
|Win
|9–0
|align=left| Rudy Mairena Ruiz
|UD
|6
|17 Sep 2005
|align=left|
|align=left|
|-
|8
|Win
|8–0
|align=left| Daniel Vega
|TKO
|2 (4), 
|8 Jul 2005
|align=left|
|align=left|
|-
|7
|Win
|7–0
|align=left| Claudio Bejarano
|TKO
|4 (4), 
|3 Jun 2005
|align=left|
|align=left|
|-
|6
|Win
|6–0
|align=left| Mauricio Crucce
|TKO
|4 (4), 
|9 Apr 2005
|align=left|
|align=left|
|-
|5
|Win
|5–0
|align=left| José Luis Avila
|UD
|4
|13 Nov 2004
|align=left|
|align=left|
|-
|4
|Win
|4–0
|align=left| Claudio Gomez
|UD
|4
|30 Oct 2004
|align=left|
|align=left|
|-
|3
|Win
|3–0
|align=left| Alejandro Gomez
|TKO
|4 (4), 
|10 Sep 2004
|align=left|
|align=left|
|-
|2
|Win
|2–0
|align=left| Alejandro Ontivero
|UD
|4
|29 May 2004
|align=left|
|align=left|
|-
|1
|Win
|1–0
|align=left| Luis Mena
|TKO
|3 (4)
|26 Mar 2004
|align=left|
|align=left|

References

External links

Jonathan Victor Barros - Profile, News Archive & Current Rankings at Box.Live

Featherweight boxers
1984 births
Living people
Sportspeople from Mendoza Province
Argentine male boxers